Veribest Independent School District is a public school district based in the community of Veribest, Texas (USA).

Academic achievement
In 2009, the school district was rated "academically acceptable" by the Texas Education Agency.

Schools
Veribest ISD has two campuses - Veribest High (Grades 9-12) and Veribest Elementary (Grades PK-8).

Special programs

Athletics
Veribest High School plays six-man football,
and went to the playoffs in football in 2016 and 2017. They also have made the playoffs in basketball in 2007, 2008, and 2018.

See also

List of school districts in Texas

References

External links
Veribest ISD

School districts in Tom Green County, Texas
School districts in San Angelo, Texas